Struganik is a village situated in Mionica municipality in Serbia and the birthplace of Field Marshal Živojin Mišić.

References

Populated places in Kolubara District